Sadom Kaewkanjana (born 6 July 1998) is a Thai professional golfer who plays on the Asian Tour where he has won twice. Kaewkanjana won his first Asian Tour event in 2019 at the Bangabandhu Cup Golf Open which made him the fastest qualifying school graduate to win on the Asian Tour. In 2021, he won three times on the All Thailand Golf Tour, including the Thailand Open, and led the Order of Merit. He captured his second Asian Tour title at the 2022 SMBC Singapore Open and earned the spot in the 2022 Open Championship at St Andrews.

Amateur wins
2014 Singha Thailand Junior World Championship #7
2017 Philippine Amateur Open Championship, National Team Ranking #2, Malaysian Amateur Open, All India Amateur
2018 National Team Ranking #2, National Team Ranking #4, Dutch International Junior Open

Source:

Professional wins (9)

Asian Tour wins (2)

1Co-sanctioned by the Japan Golf Tour, but unofficial money event.

Asian Development Tour wins (1)

1Co-sanctioned by the All Thailand Golf Tour

All Thailand Golf Tour wins (5)

1Co-sanctioned by the Asian Development Tour

Thailand PGA Tour wins (1)

Other wins (1)
 2021 (1) Thailand Mixed #5

Results in major championships

CUT = missed the half-way cut
"T" = tied

Team appearances
Amateur
Bonallack Trophy (representing Asia/Pacific): 2018 (winners)
Eisenhower Trophy (representing Thailand): 2016, 2018
Asian Games (representing Thailand): 2018
Nomura Cup (representing Thailand): 2017 (winners)
Southeast Asian Games (representing Thailand): 2017
Amata Friendship Cup (representing Thailand): 2018 (winners)

References

External links

Sadom Kaewkanjana
Asian Tour golfers
LIV Golf players
Sadom Kaewkanjana
Southeast Asian Games medalists in golf
Competitors at the 2017 Southeast Asian Games
Golfers at the 2018 Asian Games
Sadom Kaewkanjana
1998 births
Living people